Helge Larsson (October 25, 1916 – November 19, 1971) was a Swedish sprint canoeist who competed in the late 1930s. He won the bronze medal in the K-2 10000 m event at the 1936 Summer Olympics in Berlin.

References
DatabaseOlympics.com profile

1916 births
1971 deaths
Canoeists at the 1936 Summer Olympics
Olympic canoeists of Sweden
Olympic bronze medalists for Sweden
Swedish male canoeists
Olympic medalists in canoeing
Medalists at the 1936 Summer Olympics